Grzegorz Walasek  (born 29 August 1976) is a Polish speedway rider who has ridden for the Polish national team and has also competed in the Speedway Grand Prix series.

Career
Born in Krosno Odrzańskie, Poland, Walasek began his senior career in 1993 with ZKŻ Zielona Góra, and won the Polish Under-21 Championship in 1997. In 2000 he began riding in the UK with Poole Pirates. In 2004 he won the senior Polish individual championship. He was part of the Polish team that won the Speedway World Cup in 2005 and 2007.

Walasek rode in 22 Speedway Grand Prix, reaching one final and scoring a total of 138 points.

For his sporting achievements, he received the Golden Cross of Merit in 2007.

In 2015 Walasek returned to ZKŻ Zielona Góra for a third stint, extended his contract with Rospiggarna in Sweden, and signed to ride for Leicester Lions in the Elite League.

World Championships 
 Speedway Grand Prix
 2001 - 16th place (34 points as wild card and reserve)
 2002 - 21st place (25 points)
 2004 - 23rd place (13 points as wild card)
 2009 - 13th place (66 points)
 Speedway World Cup
 2002 - 4th place (2 points)
 2004 - 4th place (5 points in race-off)
 2005 - Winner
 2007 - Winner

European Championships 
 Individual European Championship
 2006 - Silver medal
 European Pairs Championship
 2006 - 1st place (12+2 points in Semi-Final B)
 European Club Champions' Cup
 2004 - European Champion (12 points)
 2009 -  Toruń - European Champion (8 pts) Rivne

Polish Championships 
 Individual Polish Championship
2004 - Polish Champion
 Individual U-21 Polish Championship
 1997 - Polish Champion
 Team Polish Championship (Speedway Ekstraliga)
 2003 - Polish Champion
 2004 - Bronze medal
 2005 - Bronze medal
 Golden Helmet
 2004 - Bronze medal
 2007 - Gold medal
 Silver Helmet (U-21)
 1997 - Bronze medal
 Bronze Helmet (U-19)
 1995 - Bronze medal

Speedway Grand Prix results

See also 
Poland national speedway team
List of Speedway Grand Prix riders

References 

1976 births
Living people
Polish speedway riders
Speedway World Cup champions
Polish speedway champions
Poole Pirates riders
Lakeside Hammers riders
Leicester Lions riders
People from Krosno Odrzańskie
Polonia Bydgoszcz riders
Sportspeople from Lubusz Voivodeship